Brand New Music (Hangul: 브랜뉴 뮤직, also stylized as BrandNew Music and initialized as BNM) is a South Korean hip hop company founded in 2011 by rapper .

History

2003–2012: Founding and first-generation artists 
Kim Se-hwan (Hangul: 김세환), known as Rhymer, founded the record label IC Entertainment in 2003 after having failed to establish a career as a rapper since his debut in 1995. The label later changed its name to Brand New Production. In 2009, Brand New Production merged with Future Flow, a record label owned by rapper and producer Cho PD. The combined company was named Brand New Stardom.

Brand New Stardom split into two companies in 2011, with Cho PD founding Stardom Entertainment and Rhymer founding Brand New Music. Artists Verbal Jint, Tae Hye Young, BNR, Keeproots, A-Man, and Miss S followed Rhymer to the new label.

Following the split of Brand New Stardom in 2011, the newly founded Stardom Entertainment sued Brand New Music, saying that Oh Yoo-mi, a member of Miss S, was still contracted with Stardom. According to Brand New Music, the two companies had previously agreed that "neither company would restrict Miss $'s movement."

Brand New Music released its first label collaboration, "Happy Brand New Year," at the end of 2012. Artists Verbal Jint, Phantom, As One, Miss S, Swings, Shijin, and Bumkey  all contributed to the single. It reached #24 on Korea's Gaon Digital Chart.

2013–2016: second-generation artists 
In January 2013, Brand New Music launched its own Internet show, Brand New Live. That summer, rapper San E left major music label JYP Entertainment and joined Brand New Music. He has since become one of the most awarded artists in the label and one of the most successful rappers in Korean mainstream media.

In early 2014, the label released its second collaboration, "You Make Me Feel Brand New", featuring Verbal Jint, San. E, Bumkey, Kanto, Swings and Phantom. The song samples the 1974 American soul hit song of the same name by The Stylistics. The single reached #13 on the Gaon Digital Chart. Later that year, R&B singer C-Luv (now known as Taewan) joined the label, having debuted ten years prior under Rhymer's Brand New Production label. A few months later, rapper Swings left the label to focus on his own record label, Just Music Entertainment. In December, the label released "Brand New Day," its third collaboration, which featured Verbal Jint, San E, Phantom, As One, P-Type, Taewan, Kang Min-hee (of Miss $), Kanto, Champagne & Candle, Yang Da-il and DJ IT. The song reached #30 on the Gaon Digital Chart. The year ended with Bumkey of the group Troy being indicted for dealing illegal drugs. Bumkey denied the allegations and was found not guilty in a trial the following year.

Several artists joined Brand New Music in 2015, including Eluphant, Gree, Pretty Brown, and Unpretty Rapstar 2 contestant KittiB. Brand New Music released its fourth label collaboration, "Heat It Up" in December. The song featured San E, Verbal Jint, Bumkey, Hanhae, Kanto, Kang Min-hee, Yang Da-il and Candle.

2016 saw new additions to the label including the Esbee, Chancellor, and actor Yang Dong-geun who raps under the name YDG.

2017–present: Sub-label and third-generation artists 
In 2017, Brand New Music launched its indie sub-label "Korean Roulette", led by Kiggen as president. The first act to sign under it was the duo SBGB. In July 2017, Brand New formed a duo MXM.

On May 22, 2019, Brand New debuted their first idol group AB6IX, with Lee Dae-hwi, Park Woo-jin and Kim Dong-hyun among the members.

On October 29, 2019, Brand New debuted BDC.

On December 26, 2019, Han Dong-geun signed an exclusive contract with the company.

On August 31, 2020, artist Lee Eun-sang, formerly of X1, made his solo debut.

On April 20, 2022, Brand New debuted their third boy group Younite.

Artists 

Soloists
 Bumkey
 DJ It
 DJ Juice
 Gree
 Han Dong-geun
 Hanhae
 Henney
 Jace (Miss S)
 Kang Min-hee (Miss S)
 Kang So-yeon
 Lee Eun-sang
 Lee Kang
 Minos
 Rhymer
 Rudals
 Taewan
 Verbal Jint
 Vincent Blue
 Yang Da-il
 Yang Dong-geun
 Yenjamin (Kim Yoon-ho)
 Yo Da-young

Groups
 AB6IX
 As One
 BDC
 Eluphant
 Miss S
 MXM
 Younite

Producers
 9999
 Assbrass
 Dong Ne-hyeong
 Elapse
 LISHBEATS
 MasterKey
 NOMAD
 On The Road
 Won Young-heon
 XEPY

Independent artists
Korean Roulette
 SBGB

Former artists 
 Bizniz
 Esna
 Chancellor
 Esbee
 J'Kyun (2011–2014)
 Kebee
 KittiB (2015–2020)
 P-Type (2011–2017)
 Phantom (2011–2017) (co-produced with RBW)
 Kiggen (2011–2018)
 Sanchez (2011–2018)
 Pretty Brown (2015–2017) (co-produced with ROOFTOP Company)
 San E (2013–2018)
 Swings (2013–2014)
 Troy (2014–2017)
 Lee Jae-woong (2014–2017)
 Joo Chang-woo (2014–2017)
 Kanto(2014–2023)
 Rudals

Discography

Concerts 
 Brand New Year 2015 (December 12, 2015)
 Brand New World Seoul (September 22, 2017)
 Brand New Year 2017 Brand New Season (December 22, 2017)

See also
 Korean hip hop
 Stardom Entertainment

References

External links
  

South Korean hip hop record labels
Labels distributed by Kakao M
Talent agencies of South Korea
Record labels established in 2011